Palcheqli (also Romanized as Pālcheqlī; also known as Pālcheqlī Āqlar) is a village in Palizan Rural District, in the Central District of Maraveh Tappeh County, Golestan Province, Iran. At the 2006 census, its population was 120, in 24 families.

References 

Populated places in Maraveh Tappeh County